Catherine Craig (born Catherine Jewel Feltus; January 18, 1915 – January 14, 2004), sometimes credited as Kay Craig, was an American actress.

Early years
Catherine Jewel Feltus was born in Bloomington, Indiana, where she was a member of Phi Beta Kappa Society at Indiana University. She was recognized as the outstanding senior girl. She later moved to Los Angeles and become an actress under the stage name of Catherine Craig.

Career
Craig was a student at the Pasadena Playhouse, and appeared in numerous bit part roles such as Las Vegas Nights (1941), West Point Widow (1941), Parachute Nurse (1942), Showboat Serenade (1944) and The Bride Wore Boots (1946).  Later, she found more success in movies such as Seven Were Saved (1947) — her first leading role, The Pretender (1947), and Albuquerque (1948). After 1950, she retired from acting and supported her husband's career.

Personal life
Craig married actor Robert Preston on November 9, 1940, in Las Vegas, Nevada. Preston pre-deceased her on March 21, 1987.

Filmography

References

Further reading
 

American film actresses
20th-century American actresses
Actresses from Indiana
People from Bloomington, Indiana
1915 births
2004 deaths
21st-century American women